Roey Ben-Shimon is an Israeli footballer who currently plays for Bnei Yehuda.

References

2000 births
Living people
Israeli Jews
Israeli footballers
Footballers from Southern District (Israel)
Bnei Yehuda Tel Aviv F.C. players
F.C. Ashdod players
Israeli Premier League players
Liga Leumit players
Association football forwards